Lucas Cornelis van Scheppingen (born 22 October 1976), better known under his stage name Laidback Luke, is a Dutch DJ and music producer. He notably remixed the Robin S. song, "Show Me Love" which charted at No. 11 on the UK charts in 2009. He is also the founder of Mixmash Records.

Career
Lucas van Scheppingen was born to a Dutch father, Kees van Scheppingen and Filipina mother, Lucy Baruelo in Manila and grew up in Hoofddorp, Netherlands together with his younger brother, Asley. He had a passion for music since a young age. Luke began his career in 1992. He credits Gaston Steenkist as an early mentor. He has worked with artists such as David Guetta, Steve Angello, the percussionist Nebat Drums, Sebastian Ingrosso, Axwell, Example and Junior Sanchez and played throughout Europe and North America as well as shows in Japan and Ibiza. He has released three studio albums: Psyched Up (1998), Electronic Satisfaction (2002), Cream Ibiza Super You & Me (2011) as well as a mix album, Windmill Skill (2003). In 2003, van Scheppingen did a remix of the Daft Punk song "Crescendolls" for the duo's remix album Daft Club. Luke has released his own mix album, titled Ibiza Closing Party, as a free covermount CD in the October 2008 issue of Mixmag.

In 2012, Laidback Luke was nominated for the best European DJ award from the 27th Dance Music Awards. He appeared in the 2016 Grammy-nominated documentary film about American DJ and producer Steve Aoki, titled I'll Sleep When I'm Dead.

Personal life
Luke was previously married two times and has three children. He married his current wife, Ashley Reina van Scheppingen, on 22 February 2020.

Laidback Luke practices kung fu, especially Choy Li Fut, and represented the Netherlands at the World Championship 2013 in China.

In March 2018, he was featured on the cover of Men's Health NL, and talked about his kung fu career.

Discography

Electronic Satisfaction (2002)
Focus (2015)

References

External links
 

1976 births
Living people
Club DJs
Dutch DJs
Dutch house musicians
Dutch people of Filipino descent
Dutch expatriates in the United States
Filipino DJs
Filipino dance musicians
Filipino record producers
Remixers
Progressive house musicians
Electronic dance music DJs